The Seputeh Komuter station is a KTM Komuter train station named after and located in Seputeh, Kuala Lumpur, along the KTM Komuter's Seremban Line.

The station was formerly the only train station connected to Mid Valley Megamall and the rest of the adjoining Mid Valley City commercial area since the area begun operation from 1999. In 2004, the newer Mid Valley station was opened directly serving Mid Valley City.

The facilities available at Seputeh Station are just like most other small halts on the line, which include ticket counters, ticket vending machines, a Touch n Go Lane and toilets. The counter operating hours is from 6.30 am to 8.30 pm daily, just like most other Komuter stations.

External links
Kuala Lumpur MRT & KTM Komuter Integrations

Railway stations in Kuala Lumpur
Seremban Line